Sisu Ananta Dasa (also spelled Ananta Dasa; ; born ) was an Odia poet, litterateur and mystic. He was one of  the five great poets in Odia literature, the Panchasakha during the Bhakti age of literature. He is known for his work Hetu Udaya Bhagabata.

Personal life 
Not much is known about his early life. Some of the later writers have mentioned his parentage. Ananta was born Ananta Mohanty at village Balipatana. His father's name was Kapila Mohanty. He was one of the chief saints of Utkaliya Vaishnavism and propagator of the Sisu sampradaya.

Literary works 
His magnum opus was Hetu Udaya Bhāgabata. A list of his known works is as below.

 Chumbaka Malikā
 Nilagiri Charita
 Hetu Udaya Bhāgabata
 Artha Tāreni Prasnottara
 Anākāra Samhitā
 Bhaktimuktipradāyaka Gita

References 

Poets from Odisha
Indian male poets
Odia-language poets
Odia people
15th-century Indian poets
Devotees of Jagannath
Odissi music composers
15th-century Hindu religious leaders
1475 births